Alejandro Crespo is an Argentine trade unionist.

In April 2016 he was elected as the general secretary of SUTNA, the tire workers' union, an affiliate of the Argentine Workers' Central Union (CTA).  He was elected as the candidate of the red-black-granate list.

He is a member of the Workers' Party (Argentina).

External links 
Workers' Party on his election (Spanish)
SUTNA website

Living people
Argentine trade union leaders
Workers' Party (Argentina) politicians
General secretaries
Tire industry people
Place of birth missing (living people)
Year of birth missing (living people)